Dihydroxyamphetamine may refer to:

 meta-Hydroxynorephedrine (3,β-dihydroxyamphetamine) 
 para-Hydroxynorephedrine (4,β-dihydroxyamphetamine) 
 Metaraminol ((1R,2S)-3,β-dihydroxyamphetamine) 
 α-Methyldopamine (3,4-dihydroxyamphetamine)